Hans Schuberth (April 5, 1897 in Schwabach – September 2, 1976 in Munich) was a German politician who from 1949 to 1953 was the first Federal Minister for Post and Telecommunications in Konrad Adenauer's first cabinet.

Biography
After graduation in 1914 Schuberth participated as a soldier in the First World War. After being seriously wounded, as a result of which he had to have a leg amputated, he was from 1915 to 1916 working as an intern at a machines factory in Germany in Dortmund. After he graduated in 1916 to study mechanical engineering at the Technical University Munich, which he finished in 1920 as a graduate engineer (mechanical engineering). During his studies he became a member of the Catholic Student Association KDSt.V. Rheno - Franconia in Munich CV. He then worked as an engineer at the German Werke AG in Dachau and Munich. From 1925 to 1926 he completed an additional study of electrical engineering, which he also graduated with a diploma. He then entered 1926 in the service of the Reichspost. In 1934 he was forcibly transferred to the Reich Central Post Office in Berlin and, since he refused to join the Nazi party, no longer promoted. He worked at the Reich postal Central Directorate from 1937 in Landshut, then from 1943 in Munich.

After the Second World War, he was appointed in 1945 as Vice President of Oberpostdirektion Munich. In October 1945, he became president of the Postal Directorate Regensburg. In 1947, he was appointed President of the Munich Oberpostdirektion.

Political career
In 1947 he was appointed Secretary of State for Posts and Telecommunications in the Bavarian State Ministry of Transport. From 1947 to 1949 he was then elected Director of the Department of Posts and Telecommunications in the administration of the United Economic Area in Frankfurt am Main. After the general election in 1949 he was appointed on 20 September 1949 as the Federal Minister for Post and Telecommunications in the first cabinet of Konrad Adenauer. After the parliamentary elections of 1953, he retired under the pretext of sectarian proportional representation in the Cabinet at the request of Adenauer, who wanted above all to weaken the CSU, before the appointment of his successor in office the Protestant Siegfried Balke on 9 December 1953 to the Federal Government. Schuberth was then briefly at 1953/54, special ambassador to the Vatican.

Schuberth was a deputy of the German Bundestag from 1953 to 1957 as representative of the constituency of Landshut. In 1957 he brought together with other members of parliament from CSU and DP a bill to repeal Article 102 of the Basic Law, to reintroduce the death penalty with the objective of which, however, never came to a vote.

1897 births
1976 deaths
People from the Kingdom of Bavaria
People from Schwabach
Technical University of Munich alumni
German Roman Catholics
Members of the Bundestag for Bavaria
Grand Crosses 1st class of the Order of Merit of the Federal Republic of Germany
Burials at the Westfriedhof (Munich)
Members of the Bundestag for the Christian Social Union in Bavaria